Terrace Park High School/Elementary School (built 1913) is a school building in Terrace Park, Ohio in the Greater Cincinnati area.

History

Establishment

The site for the school at 723 Elm was first established in the early 1870s when T. R. Biggs deeded it to the village, and the "village voted $12,000 for a school there."  Prior to the 1913 building's construction, another building preceded it and served as the school from 1872 until 1913.  The 1872 structure was an alternative to the "one room schoolhouse, built in 1853, [that] still stands at the corner of Given, Indian Hill and Wooster Pike.".  The 1872 building formerly stood in front of the 1913 building and no longer exists.     The 1913 building cost approximately $30,000.   Images of the 1872 and 1913 buildings can be viewed at this site:  Terrace Park Survey for 723 Elm--Photos  The 1913 building functioned as a high school until 1957, when it joined the Mariemont School District, and  eventually the building along with its additions became Terrace Park's elementary school.  Graduates of the High School (including the older building) can be found here:  List of Graduates

Two thousand years ago, part of the site of the Terrace Park school was occupied by "one of the largest of its kind of the 295 prehistoric earthworks ever found in Hamilton County.... In 1820, when it first attracted scientific interest, it was still six feet high and 12 feet wide at its base."

Demolition of Interior

Under $39 million school plans to renovate facilities throughout the Mariemont School District (which includes this building), most of the interior of the building will be demolished using bond money approved on May 4, 2010 as part of a "combination bond
issue/operating levy." School district documents indicate the estimated cost of demolition and rebuilding of Terrace Park Elementary School to be $12.5 Million or $220 per sq. ft.  According to the District this is to save money:  "Funding the entire facilities plan now costs less than the current path of fixing aging systems as they break."

If the bond had not been approved, the School Board planned "reductions [to] include elimination of elementary art, music, and physical education and the implementation of a full pay to participate system in the district that would cost athletes, musicians, and actors an estimated $450 ‐ $1000 per high school activity."

Interior items of the building were sold on April 4, 2011.  Images of interior items that had been put up for sale from the 1913 building (along with items from subsequent additions) can be seen here: Images of Interior Items

Asbestos abatement was scheduled to begin on April 6, 2011.
Demolition is scheduled to begin on April 25, 2011.

Footnotes

Further reading

 "Virginia Marquett's history of Terrace Park High School," a book mentioned in preface to A Place Called Terrace Park by Ellis Rawnsley, 1992

External links
 Slide Show History of Terrace Park School, 1930 - 1957, Produced by: Rohrig Video (Mark Rohrig), Directed by: Ralph "R.J." Vilardo, Class of '49, Historian: Virginia Cook Marquett, Class of '41
 Terrace Park Survey for 723 Elm (address of the building)
 Terrace Park links
 Terrace Park Building Survey
 Terrace Park Historical Society
  Construction Plans for Replacement Elementary School
  Construction Plans for All Mariemont School District Facilities

1913 establishments in Ohio
Educational institutions established in 1913
Education in Hamilton County, Ohio